The Underprivileged Area Score is an index to measure socio-economic variation across small geographical areas.  The score is an outcome of the need identified in the Acheson Committee Report (into General Practitioner (GP) services in the UK) to create an index to identify 'underprivileged areas' where there were high numbers of patients and hence pressure on general practitioner services.

Its creation involved the random distribution of a questionnaire among general practitioners throughout the UK. This was then used to obtain statistical weights for a calculation of a composite index of underprivileged areas based on GPs' perceptions of workload and patient need. (Jarman, 1984)

References

Elliott P, Cuzick J, English D, Stern R. (2001) Geographical and Environmental Epidemiology. Methods for Small-Area Studies. Oxford University Press. New York, 
Jarman, B. (1983) Identification of underprivileged areas. British Medical Journal 1705 - 1709

Epidemiology
Social statistics